36 East 72nd Street is a luxury residential housing cooperative on the Upper East Side of Manhattan, New York City. In 1995 it was ranked among the top 10 cooperative buildings in Manhattan by The New Yorker. Well-known residents have included Robert Agostinelli and Carlos Brillembourg. The 15-story, 1927 building has only 17 apartments.

References 

Residential buildings completed in 1927
Condominiums and housing cooperatives in Manhattan
Upper East Side
Residential buildings in Manhattan